In law the general term privilege revocation is often used when discussing some paper, such as a drivers licence, being voided after a (negative) condition is met by the holder.

References 
State of Rhode Island General Assembly AN ACT RELATING TO SUSPENSION OF SCHOOL BUS DRIVER'S CERTIFICATES CHAPTER 36, 97-H 5836 am, Approved July 1, 1997

United States criminal law